Magomed Aripgadzhiyev (born 23 September 1977) is a Belarusian boxer who won a silver medal in the light heavyweight division (– 81 kg) at the 2004 Summer Olympics. He qualified for the 2004 Summer Olympics by ending up in second place at the 4th AIBA European 2004 Olympic Qualifying Tournament in Baku, Azerbaijan. He previously represented Azerbaijan in the 2000 Olympics.

Professional career
Aripgadzhiyev turned pro in 2005, and by 2010 won 16 bouts (10 by knockout) and lost two.

References

 
 

1977 births
Living people
Belarusian people of Dagestani descent
Olympic boxers of Azerbaijan
Olympic boxers of Belarus
Boxers at the 2000 Summer Olympics
Boxers at the 2004 Summer Olympics
Olympic silver medalists for Belarus
Azerbaijani male boxers
Azerbaijani people of Dagestani descent
Olympic medalists in boxing
People from Kaspiysk
Belarusian male boxers
AIBA World Boxing Championships medalists
Medalists at the 2004 Summer Olympics
Light-heavyweight boxers